Norlat is a rural locality (a selo) in Zelenodolsky District, Tatarstan. The population was 2693 as of 2010.

Geography 
Norlat is located 33 km southwest of Yäşel Üzän, district's administrative centre, and 85 km southwest of Qazan, republic's capital, by road.

History 
The village already existed during the period of the Khanate of Qazan.

From 17th to first half of the 19th centuries village's residents belonged to the social estate of state peasants.

By the beginning of the twentieth century, village had 4 mosques, 2 , 3 windmills, 3 forges, and 12 small shops.

Before the creation of Tatar ASSR in 1920 was a part of Zöyä Uyezd of Qazan Governorate. Since 1920 was a part of Zöyä  Canton; after creation of districts in Tatar ASSR (Tatarstan) in Norlat-Açasır (later Norlat) (1927–1963) and Yäşel Üzän districts.

Notable people 

References

External links 
 

Rural localities in Zelenodolsky District